Analog Days is a 2006 film directed and written by Mike Ott. It premiered at the 2006 Los Angeles Film Festival. It was also invited to screen at the Cinequest Film Festival in San Jose, California, The Viennale Film Festival in Vienna, Austria and Film Pop Film Festival in Montreal, Quebec, Canada, in October 2006.

Plot
Newhall, California sits about thirty miles north of Los Angeles, not quite the middle of nowhere, but not exactly a real city either. It's somewhere in between. A place where the youth work at Video Depot, go to community college, struggle with jocks and townies, and all do their best to understand politics, their careers, their love life and self-image. It's here that Jordan, Molly, Tammy, and Lloyd are about to understand that in life you don't always get what you want. Sometimes you're stuck never leaving home, never fitting in, or never really knowing who your friends are. This is their transition toward growing up and realizing that real life doesn't always end up like a movie.

Cast
 Chad Cunningham - Lloyd
 Ivy Khan - Tammy
 Granger Green - Molly
 Brett L. Tinnes - Jordan
 Rhyan Johnsen - Fenster
 Shaughn Buccholz - Derek
 Jonathon Burbridge - Lawler
 Nathan Rodriguez - Peter
 Jackie Buscarino - Melanie
 Tyler Nelson - Dameco
 Charles Pasternak - Charles
 David Nordstrom - Troy
 Jon Brotherton - Butler
 Ryan Dillion - Alex

References

External links

Official website of Analog Days
Official website of Small Form Films

2006 films
American independent films
2006 independent films
2000s English-language films
2000s American films